Serena Williams was the defending champion, and successfully defended her title, defeating Jennifer Capriati in a rematch of last year's final, 4–6, 6–4, 6–1.

Seeds
All seeds received a bye into the second round.

  Serena Williams (champion)
  Venus Williams (fourth round)
  Kim Clijsters (semifinals)
  Justine Henin-Hardenne (quarterfinals)
  Daniela Hantuchová (second round)
  Jennifer Capriati (final)
  Lindsay Davenport (fourth round, retired)
  Amélie Mauresmo (fourth round)
  Jelena Dokić (quarterfinals)
  Monica Seles (withdrew)
  Anastasia Myskina (second round)
  Chanda Rubin (semifinals)
  Magdalena Maleeva (third round)
  Eleni Daniilidou (third round)
  Anna Pistolesi (fourth round)
  Elena Bovina (second round)
  Ai Sugiyama (third round)
  Amanda Coetzer (second round)
  Elena Dementieva (second round)
  Silvia Farina Elia (third round)
  Nathalie Dechy (third round)
  Lisa Raymond (third round)
  Meghann Shaughnessy (quarterfinals)
  Alexandra Stevenson (second round)
  Tatiana Panova (third round)
  Clarisa Fernández (third round)
  Paola Suárez (third round)
  Elena Likhovtseva (third round)
  Iva Majoli (second round)
  Tamarine Tanasugarn (third round)
  Laura Granville (third round)
  Marie-Gayanay Mikaelian (second round)

Draw

Finals

Top half

Section 1

Section 2

Section 3

Section 4

Bottom half

Section 5

Section 6

Section 7

Section 8

External links
Draw

2003 NASDAQ-100 Open
NASDAQ-100 Open